Ghliana Cave Natural Monument is a karst cave located near village Kumistavi, Tsqaltubo Municipality in Imereti region of Georgia, 142 meters above sea level.

Morphology 
Ghliana karst cave is carved in limestone and has two entrances. The main entrance has height 3.5-4 meters, and width – 7 meters. The main underground stream flows from this entrance. The second entrance to the left from the main entrance is very steep and measures 35-40 m from cave floor to the surface. 
60 meters from entrance there is a deep siphon lake, 3-4 m wide, 2.5 m height above lake surface and 50 meters long. Behind the lake there is a  200 m long siphon corridor with it floor under water with depth of 0.5-2 meters. Behind the corridor there is a gallery with a length of 30 m and a width of 1-2 m. It traverses the bigger 150 m gallery with ceiling covered with stalactites almost it entire length. This gallery again has water and several siphonous exits to the bottom of the cave. The underground flow measures 50-55 litre per second in a flood. The water streams from the cave end up in Kumi river.

Fauna 

Numerous colonies of bats inhabit the dry corridors of the cave.
The inhabitants of the cave also include Trachysphaera, Attheyella, Pilocamptus, Deuterosminthurus, Proisotoma, Hypoaspis and Macrocheles.

See also 
Prometheus Cave Natural Monument

References

Natural monuments of Georgia (country)
Caves of Georgia (country)
Protected areas established in 2011
Geography of Imereti